Ethalia catharinae is a species of sea snail, a marine gastropod mollusk in the family Trochidae, the top snails.

Description
The size of the shell attains 16 mm.

Distribution
This marine species occurs off the Philippines.

References

External links
 

catharinae
Gastropods described in 2006